Sikuru Alimi (born 22 September 1942) is a Nigerian boxer. He competed in the men's welterweight event at the 1964 Summer Olympics.

References

External links

1942 births
Living people
Nigerian male boxers
Olympic boxers of Nigeria
Boxers at the 1964 Summer Olympics
Place of birth missing (living people)
Welterweight boxers